Madhesi Youth Forum is the youth wing of the Madhesi Janadhikar Forum in Nepal. As of April 2007, Jitedra Sen was the president of MYF.

References

Youth wings of political parties in Nepal